A bonded logistics park is a type of special economic zone.  Trade arrangements are similar to that of a bonded warehouse but over a specific geographic area.  Sometimes with international port capabilities.  Goods may be stored, manipulated, or undergo manufacturing operations without payment of duty.

China
China’s bonded logistic parks have similar rules to free-trade zones (another specific type of special economic zone) except for export VAT refund.  Export VAT refund is eligible for a Chinese company once their goods enter the park.

Locations
 Zhangjiagang Bonded Logistics Park, Jiangsu province
 Yantian Port Bonded Logistics Park, Guangdong province

See also
 Entrepôt
 Free economic zone
 Free-trade zone
 List of free economic zones

References

Special economic zones